Middlesex and Monmouth Turnpike was the name of two turnpikes chartered in New Jersey. 

The first, chartered on March 13, 1863, was to run from the crossing of the Camden and Amboy Rail Road at Old Bridge to the Monmouth County Plank Road at Matawan. After the turnpike ceased operation, much of this route would later become a part of County Route 516.

The second was chartered on March 4, 1868, and was to run from the road "from Mount's Mills to Old Bridge" (present-day County Route 527) to the Monmouth County Plank Road at Matawan. Much of this route consisted of present-day Texas Road. This turnpike was never constructed.

See also
List of turnpikes in New Jersey
County Route 516
County Route 520
County Route 690

References

Transportation in Middlesex County, New Jersey
Transportation in Monmouth County, New Jersey
Roads in New Jersey